Mir Dariya Khan Khoso (1925–2006) was a politician of the Jacobabad District who was a Member of the National Assembly of Pakistan from 1962 to 1977. He was the grandson of Mir Bahadur Khan Khoso, father of MPA Mir Hassan Khan Khoso.Mir sahib were a very honorable, dignified and worthy person. Mir Sahib passed away on 4 November 2006 in Karachi. He was buried in his native village "Dinpur" Taluk Thul District Jacobabad.

Soyem of Mir Dariya Khan was held in his village Dinpur

References 

Pakistani politicians
1925 births
2006 deaths